Anthony Duncombe (died 4 April 1708), was an English politician.

Duncombe was the son of Alexander Duncombe, of Drayton, Buckinghamshire, by Mary Paulye, daughter of Richard Paulye, Lord of the Manor of Whitchurch, Buckinghamshire. Wealthy banker Sir Charles Duncombe was his brother. He was returned to Parliament for Hedon in 1698, a seat he held until July 1702, and again between November 1702 and his death in 1708.

Duncombe married Jane Cornwallis, daughter of the Honourable Frederick Cornwallis, younger son of Frederick Cornwallis, 1st Baron Cornwallis. He died in April 1708. His son Anthony inherited half of the enormous estates of his uncle Sir Charles Duncombe and was elevated to the peerage as Baron Feversham in 1747. Duncombe's sister Ursula Duncombe was the ancestor of the present-day Barons Feversham.

References

1708 deaths
Anthony
Year of birth missing
English MPs 1698–1700
English MPs 1701
English MPs 1701–1702
English MPs 1702–1705
English MPs 1705–1707
British MPs 1707–1708
Members of the Parliament of Great Britain for Hedon
Members of the Parliament of England for Hedon